Madocsa is a village in Tolna County, Hungary.

Location 
Madocsa situated 1.5 km to the west direction from Danube river, 5–6 km to the east direction form the border of Tolna hilly country, on a higher point of the flood area. Can be reached from Dunaföldvár (14 km) to the south direction on an almost parallel road with Danube via Bölcske, or from Paks (11 km) to the north-east direction leaving the main road No. 6 at Dunakömlőd.

References

External links 
 
 Street map 

Populated places in Tolna County